Ajay Singh (15 August 1950 – 9 June 2020) was an Indian politician and diplomat.

Early life 
Ajay Singh was born on 15 August 1950. His father Captain Bhagwan Singh, IAS (Rtd) was born in village Jaingara, Kerawli Tehsil, District Agra in Uttar Pradesh. After a distinguished career in the Army and the IAS (he belonged to the first batch of the Service), he retired as India's High Commissioner to Fiji, Tonga, Nauru and other Pacific Islands.

His mother, Shanta Singh was born in Bharau village, Sadabad Tehsil, District Mathura in Uttar Pradesh. He has three sisters. Abha Singh, married to Karan Pal Singh, Vibha Singh, married to Maharaj Digvijay Sinh of Wankaner in Gujarat and younger sister Shubha Singh married to Yatinder Kumar. While Abha is settled in USA, Shubha (who lives in New Delhi) is a prominent journalist and author.

He was married to late Shiromani Tiwari Singh, daughter of late Shreedhar and late Sumitra Maharaj of Fiji. She is a 3rd generation Fiji Indian, born and brought up there. She came to India to do BA (Hons) in English Literature from Miranda House, Delhi University before returning to join the Fiji Civil Service as an officer. Her forefathers hailed from Dhakiya village, District Faizabad in Uttar Pradesh.

He studied at Delhi's prestigious Modern School before graduating in English (Hons) Literature from St Stephens College, Delhi University in 1971. In school, he was adjudged the "Best Sportsman of the Year (1967) and captained the school hockey, swimming and water polo teams. He captained the College as well as the University swimming and water polo teams, participating in inter State and inter University championships from 1965 to 1971.

He did his post graduate studies at the School of Journalism, University of Canterbury (1974), Christchurch, New Zealand and later worked as Publicity and Promotions Officer with Television One, Avalon, Lower Hutt, in Wellington. He returned to Fiji as Senior Sub Editor with The Fiji Times before coming back to India after five years at the end of December 1976.

From 1977 to 1980, he worked as Assistant Editor Surya India (a monthly magazine), News editor India Today and Deputy Editor in charge of Morning Echo (an English tabloid daily of The Hindustan Times group).

In 1980 he took over as managing trustee of the Kisan Trust and Editor-in Chief of its publications: Asli Bharat (Hindi Weekly newspaper), Asli Bharat (Urdu weekly magazine) and Real India (English weekly magazine). These journals were Oppositionist papers devoted to espousing the cause of rural India, hence their names. The Hindi weekly newspaper (later converted into a monthly magazine) won a wide and devoted readership, particularly in rural areas of the Hindi heartland. As a monthly, it was acclaimed as one of the leaders in “alternative” journalism as opposed to the “mainstream”.

As Managing Trustee of the Kisan Trust, he worked closely with veteran Socialist leaders Madhu Limaye and George Fernandes, Shri Biju Patnaik, Karpoori Thakur Bihar, Biju Patnaik (Orissa) and Mulayam Singh Yadav. His close colleagues were Sharad Yadav, Ram Vilas Paswan among others. They were all Trustees of the Trust and its chairman was Ch Charan Singh. After Charan Singh's death in 1987, all the veteran leaders unanimously elected him Chairman in his place.

He was elected to the Legislative Council of Uttar Pradesh unopposed in 1986. In 1989 he won the Lok Sabha Parliamentary seat from Agra defeating a family that had held the seat since Independence. He served as Union Deputy Minister for Railways in Mr VP Singh's government.

He later served as Chairman of the Centre for Cultural Resources and Training (CCRT), an autonomous body with the Human Resources Ministry. Later as chairman, Governing Body of the Sri Aurobindo College, Delhi University.

In 2005 he was appointed India's High Commissioner to Fiji Islands, Tonga, Tuvalu and Cook Islands. He served there until June 2007. His father had held the same post thirty years earlier.

Besides being a sportsperson, a journalist/editor of prominent journals, a member of UP's Legislative Council, of the Lok Sabha, a Union Minister, an educationist, and a diplomat, Ajay Singh has been asked by elders of his community to head their organisations.

He briefly served as President of All India Jat Mahasabha from 30 March 2013 to 12 May 2013.

Offices 
He was the Member of Parliament from Agra constituency in 1989. He was minister of state for railways in the Indian government in 1989 and 1990. On 14 July 2005, he was also appointed as the High Commissioner of India to the Government of Tuvalu.

President of All India Jat Mahasabha 

A general meeting of senior members of the All India Jat Mahasabha, was held on 18 July 2012 at the Deputy Speaker's Hall, Constitutional Club, Rafi Marg, New Delhi to mourn the death of its president, late Ch Dara Singh, the veteran wrestler-turned-movie star and former Member of Parliament.
At the meeting, speakers recalled his yeoman's contribution to the Mahasabha in various capacities and termed his death as a great loss for the community as well as the nation. Ch Dara Singh died at Mumbai on 12 July 2012 after a brief illness. After paying rich tributes to the departed soul, the meeting unanimously nominated Shri Ajay Singh as convener to convene a Jat Mahasabha Mahapanchayat to elect its next president.

After extensive deliberations Shri Balram Jakhar presiding over the Mahasabha proposed Ch Ajay Singh's name for president, recalling Shri Ajay Singh's late father, Captain Bhagwan Singh's work as the president (1979 to 1991) of the mahasabha in reviving the organisation which had been defunct since the death of Raja Mahendra Pratap Singh in 1979.
Dr Aryaveer addressing the Mahasabha He recalled how Captain Bhagwan Singh had toured the country spreading the Mahasabha from Jammu to Andhra Pradesh to bring Jats from all over country into the mahasabha folds

In 1998 Shri Ajay Singh played an important role by leading a delegation to Mumbai to bring Ch Dara Singh to the Mahapanchayat. 
Shri Baldev Sihag (Former OSD to Ch Devilal), Shri Dharampal Sirohi (Eminent Journalist), Shri Dharamraj Panwar and Ch Amarpal Singh (Political/Social activists) and Shri Yadunath Singh(Former Deputy Speaker, Rajasthan) were part of the delegation led by Shri Ajay Singh to Mumbai on this occasion.
Late Dara Singh agreed to attend the mahapanchayat where he was unanimously elected the president of Mahasabha. Lt Gen K.K. Singh (senior most Jat military officer), Ch Ajay Singh (Former Union Minister) and Shri Chhetilal Verma (Founder Chairman Continental Construction Limited) were nominated as Patrons in Mahasabha. Past mahasabha president Shri Vishvendra Singh, Shri Kamlesh Bharti (Vrindavan) were also later included as Patrons.

While seconding the proposals of Shri Ajay Singh's name Shri K Natwar Singh recalled great literary work done by the mahasabha under Capt Bhagwan Singh, particularly in historical research on Jats. He hoped Shri Ajay Singh as a veteran journalist and eminent editor would carry forward this legacy.
Professor Zile Singh Rana who conducted the program asked for the vote and Ajay Singh was unanimously elected as the President of All India Jat Maha Sabha with the raising of hands, beating of Nagada, slogans and showers of flowers and garlands.

On 30 March 2013 from 11.00 am to 4.00 pm, the Akhil Bharatiya Jat Maha Sammelan held at Mavalankar Hall in Vitthal Bhai Patel House at Rafi Marg. The Sammelan was presided over by Shri Balram Jakhar former Speaker of the Lok Sabha and Governor. During the event, a number of prominent leaders spoke about the need for unity amongst the Jat Community.

The community elected Shri Ajay Singh as the President of All India . Shri Vijay Punia tied the Turban on his head. Those present recalled how he had performed a similar task when he convened the Jat mahapanchayat on 14 September 1998 at the lawns of the Vitthal Bhai Patel House at Rafi Marg, New Delhi in which Ch Dara Singh was unanimously elected the President.
 
The convention was addressed by Kunwar Natwar Singh, former Union Minister, Shri Bhupinder Singh Hooda Chief Minister of Haryana, Shri Manpreet Singh Badal, former Finance Minister, Punjab State, Smt. Kiran Choudhry Minister Haryana, Smt. Chandrawati, former Lt. Governor, Puducherry, Shri Vijai Punia, Shri Raghu Thakur (senior and respected Socialist Leader and President of Loktantrik Samajwadi Party), Mr. Harendra Malik, former M.P, Col.(Rtd) Sonaram Jat, former M.P. and Smt. Kushal Singh, former Chief Secretary of Rajasthan.

He was succeeded by Amarinder Singh (former chief minister of Punjab) as the President of Jat Mahasabha.

References

1950 births
2020 deaths
High Commissioners of India to Fiji
High Commissioners of India to Nauru
High Commissioners of India to Tonga
High Commissioners of India to Tuvalu
Indian expatriates in Fiji
Indian civil servants
People from Agra district
University of Canterbury alumni
Delhi University alumni
India MPs 1989–1991
Union ministers of state of India
Lok Sabha members from Uttar Pradesh
Janata Dal politicians
Politicians from Agra